Rajgriha Express  is a daily Express train of Indian Railways, running between Rajgir, near Nalanda, Bihar, and Danapur, near Patna, Bihar, via Nalanda, Bihar Sharif and Bakhtiyarpur Junction.

References

External links
 13233/Rajgriha Express India Rail Info
 13234/Rajgriha Express India Rail Info

Transport in Patna
Rail transport in Bihar
Named passenger trains of India
Express trains in India